Xanthe, minor planet designation 411 Xanthe, is an asteroid from the outer regions of the asteroid belt, approximately 77 kilometers in diameter. It was discovered by French astronomer Auguste Charlois at Nice Observatory on 7 January 1896. The asteroid was named after Xanthe, an Oceanid or sea nymph, and one of the many Titan daughters of Oceanus and Tethys from Greek mythology.

References

External links 
 Asteroid Lightcurve Database (LCDB), query form (info )
 Dictionary of Minor Planet Names, Google books
 Asteroids and comets rotation curves, CdR – Observatoire de Genève, Raoul Behrend
 Discovery Circumstances: Numbered Minor Planets (1)-(5000) – Minor Planet Center
 
 

000411
Discoveries by Auguste Charlois
Named minor planets
18960107